The Cousins Bros. Trading Post, near Chi Chil Tah, New Mexico, was built in 1930.  It was listed on the National Register of Historic Places in 2006.

Also known as the Cousins Bros. It is made of stone, concrete, and adobe. Its east-facing front has a gradually stepped parapet and a centered entrance.

References

Trading posts
National Register of Historic Places in McKinley County, New Mexico
Buildings and structures completed in 1930